The following is a list of original and syndicated programming that aired on the defunct Esquire Network, also formerly known as the Style Network.

Former programming

Original

Style
 The Amandas (2012)
 Big Rich Atlanta (2013)
 Big Rich Texas (2011-13)
 Built (2013)
 Chicagolicious (2012-13)
 Clean House (2003-11)
 Clean House New York (2011)
 The Dish (2008-11)
 Empire Girls: Julissa and Adrienne (2013)
 Giuliana and Bill (2009-13)
 Glam Fairy (2011-12)
 How Do I Look? (2002-14)
 Jerseylicious (2010-13)
 Kimora: House of Fab (2013)
 Kimora: Life in the Fab Lane (2007-11)
 Made in Chelsea (2012)
 Mel B: It's a Scary World (2010)
 Style Court
 Style Exposed
 Style Pop
 Style Star
 Tia & Tamera (2011-13)
 Too Fat for 15: Fighting Back (2010-11)
 Whose Wedding Is It Anyway? (2003)
 XOX Betsey Johnson (2013)

Esquire
 Brew Dogs (2013)
 Esquire 80th Anniversary Special
 Esquire's Car of the Year
 Friday Night Tykes (2014-17)
 Friday Night Tykes: Steel Country
 The Getaway (2013-14)
 Knife Fight (2013-15)
 Team Ninja Warrior (2016)

Acquired
 The A-Team
 The Agent
 Airwolf
 Alternate Route
 America's Next Top Model
 American Ninja Warrior
 Beowulf: Return to the Shieldlands
 Best Bars in America
 Bomb Patrol Afghanistan
 Boundless
 Burn Notice
 Car Matchmaker
 Chef Roblé & Co.
 City Girl Diaries
 CSI: Crime Scene Investigation
 Departures
 Dress My Nest
 Fashion Police
 Fashion Star
 Flipping Out
 Girlfriend Confidential: LA
 Going Deep with David Rees
 Horseplayers
 Hot Listings Miami
 House
 How I Rock It
 The Incredible Hulk (2014-15)
 Magnum, P.I.
 Miami Vice
 Million Dollar Listing Los Angeles
 Million Dollar Listing New York
 Momster of the Bride
 My Friends Call Me Johnny
 NCIS: Los Angeles
 Next Great Burger
 Ninja Warrior
 On the Table
 Our Big Fat Weight Loss Story
 Parks and Recreation
 Party Down
 Perfect Couples
 Peter Perfect
 Project Runway
 Psych
 Quantum Leap
 Queer Eye
 Rachel Ashwell's Shabby Chic
 Resale Royalty
 Risky Listing
 Ruby
 The Runner-Up
 Running in Heels
 Running of the Bulls
 Sex and the City
 The Short Game
 Sister, Sister
 The Six Million Dollar Man
 The Soup
 Spotless
 Supernanny
 Tacky House
 Top Chef 
 This is Mike Stud
 Uncorked
 Ultimate Style
 Weekend Fix
 What I Hate About Me
 White Collar Brawlers
 Wicked Fit
 Women We Love
 Worst Week

Esquire Network